Anopina incana is a moth of the family Tortricidae. It is found in Mexico in the state of Guerrero and Mexico City.

References

Moths described in 1914
incana
Moths of Central America